Sepo is an unincorporated community in Fulton County, Illinois, United States. Sepo is southeast of Lewistown. The name has been given to the Sepo ceramics culture c. 1000 BCE.

References

Unincorporated communities in Fulton County, Illinois
Unincorporated communities in Illinois